Dorothy Ann Fothergill (born c. 1945) is an American former left-handed ten-pin bowler.  She was named the Woman Bowler of the Year in 1968 and 1969 and defeated the top men's competitors in exhibition play. She sued the Professional Bowlers Association in 1970 when her application to compete in men's tournaments was rejected. She was inducted into the Women's International Bowling Congress (WIBC) Hall of Fame (later merged into the United States Bowling Congress Hall of Fame) in 1980. She was also one of the charter inductees into the PWBA Hall of Fame in 1995.

Early years
Fothergill was raised in North Attleboro, Massachusetts. She graduated from North Attleboro High School in 1963. Also in 1963, at age 18, she finished third in The Boston Globe's Ten Pin Tournament. She supported herself as a secretary at Walpole Lanes.

In 1966, she joined the professional bowlers tour, sponsored by Lincoln Lanes in Rhode Island, and finished third in the WIBC doubles tournament in New Orleans. She won her first tournament, the Professional Women's Bowling Association's Phoenix Women's Open, in March 1967, winning $1,850 in prize money. The following month, she tallied a record 2,409 in 12 games to win the women's division in the Sixth Annual Connecticut Cancer Bowlathon.

Bowler of the Year in 1968 and 1969
Fothergill's career peaked in 1968 and 1969. At ages 23 and 24, she was named woman Bowler of the Year in consecutive years by the Bowling Writers' Association of America (BWAA). In 1968, she became the first woman bowler to win more than $10,000 in one season. A 1969 profile on Fothergill noted that, despite her tiny frame, she was able to throw a  ball with power and accuracy. The author compared her approach to "a hungry wolf after a lamb chop."

Her tournament victories during those years included:
 May 1968 – She set an all-time WIBC record with a total score of 2,101 in nine games at the Schenectady Press tournament.
 May 1968 –  She won the Women's BPAA All-Star championship in Garden City, New York (later renamed the U.S. Women's Open). She was the first woman to win in her first All-Star appearance and the first left-hander in the men's or women's division to claim an All-Star championship. Her average of 211.11 in 36 games was just short of the record of 211.469 set by Marion Ladewig in 1951.
 August 1968 – She won the Professional Women's Bowling Association championship tournament in Flint, Michigan, taking home $3,000 in prize money. 
 May 1969 – For the second consecutive year, she won the BPAA All-Star championship held at Hialeah Lanes in Florida.

Lawsuit to compete in men's tournaments
Despite being the best female bowler, Fothergill's total earnings over a three-year period were less than the prize money for some single men's tournaments. A competitor finishing 20th in a men's tournament earned as much as the first-place finisher in a women's tournament. In May 1969, she noted that she might seek to compete in men's tournaments. Her league tournament averages were as good as 99% of the professional male bowlers. She also defeated many of the top men's bowlers, including Jim Stefanich (by 115 pins), Dick Weber (by 105 pins), Billy Hardwick (by 113 pins), and Dick Ritger (by 79 pins), in exhibition matches.

When she submitted an application to participate in the men's tournament, the executive board of the Professional Bowlers Association (PBA) voted to reject it. Fothergill recounted the reaction of male bowlers to her application: "A lot of pros have told me, 'Now listen, Dotty, if it were only you it wouldn't be bad at all. But if you get in, how many other women are going to try to do the same thing?... What would we tell our wives?' And I tell them, 'What do you tell your wives about the girls who travel the tour now and don't bowl?'"

Fothergill filed a lawsuit against the PBA seeking $2.5 million in damages on the grounds that the organization had deprived her of the ability to make a sufficient living based on her sex. The PBA responded with a countersuit seeking $6 million in damages for injury to its reputation and bringing "disastrous ridicule" to the organization.

Specifics as to the resolution of the suit are unclear, though one account published in 1993 indicated that Fothergill "found she had too many problems to continue the fight."

Later years
Fothergill continued to compete on the women's professional tour from 1970 to 1976. In 1970, she won the all-events title in the WIBC National Championships, setting a WIBC record for a nine-game score in the event. She also won the WIBC Queens tournament in 1972 and 1973 and doubles championships (with Mildred Martorella) in 1971 and 1973. Between 1967 and 1972, she won eight titles on the Professional Women's Bowlers Association tour. Over the course of her career, Fothergill won a total of 18 titles in Women's International Bowling Congress (WIBC) and professional competition. She was also the only WIBC bowler to win national titles in singles, doubles, all-events, and Queens.

Fothergill sustained an arm injury in 1976 that ended her career as a competitive bowler at age 31. The injury required surgery.

In December 1979, Fothergill was named to the WIBC Hall of Fame. The formal induction ceremony took place in April 1980. She was also one of the charter inductees into the PWBA Hall of Fame in 1995.

She lived in later years in Center Ossipee, New Hampshire.

See also
 Women's International Bowling Congress
 PWBA Hall of Fame

References 

American ten-pin bowling players
American sportswomen
1945 births
Living people
People from North Attleborough, Massachusetts
People from Ossipee, New Hampshire
American women's rights activists
Sportspeople from Bristol County, Massachusetts
Sportspeople from Carroll County, New Hampshire
21st-century American women